Ventura García-Sancho e Ibarrondo, 1st Count of Consuegra (20 April 1837, in Mexico City, Mexico – 20 July 1914, in Madrid, Spain) better known by his spouse's title Marquess of Aguilar de Campoo, was a Mexican-Spanish nobleman and politician who served twice as Minister of State and as Mayor of Madrid between 1899 and 1900.

Family and Origins 
Ventura Crisóforo Domingo Ignacio García-Sancho e Ibarrondo was born in Mexico City on 20 April 1837, the son of don José Marcial García-Sancho y Sánchez-Leñero, knight of the Ilustre Solar de Tejada, and of doña María de la Trinidad de Ibarrondo y Maruri, both from Guadalajara (México) and members of well-stablished families of Spanish origin.

During his youth, don Ventura and his family moved to Bordeaux, France, where decades before his maternal grandparents (the Basque don Domingo de Ibarrondo y Urraza, and the Mexican-criolla doña María Ignacia de Maruri y Berrueco) lived. After his mother's death in 1846, don Ventura began to pass long stays in Spain in the company of his paternal grandfather, don José Ventura García-Sancho y Moreno de Tejada (who was from Lumbreras, Spain).

Marriage and Offspring 
He married in Madrid, 2 June 1861, María del Pilar de Zavala, 20th Marchioness of Aguilar de Campoo, daughter of Juan de Zavala, 1st Marques of Sierra Bullones and María del Pilar de Guzmán, 24th Duchess of Nájera. Through his marriage, he became Grandee of Spain.

They were the parents of:

 Doña María del Pilar García-Sancho y Zavala (1864-1916), 27th Duchess of Nájera (GE), 21st Marchioness of Aguilar de Campoo (GE), V Marchioness of Sierra Bullones (GE), 21st Countess of Paredes de Nava (GE), 21st Countess of Oñate (GE), 18th Marchioness of Quintana del Marco, 10th Marchioness of Guevara, Countess of Treviño, 7th Marchioness of Torreblanca, 11th Countess of Castañeda, 2nd Countess of Consuegra. She married don Leopoldo Travesedo y Fernández-Casariego, son of the Counts of Maluque (with succession).
 Doña María del Milagro García-Sancho y Zavala (1874-1959), 15th Marchioness of Montealegre. She first married don Antonio Morenés y García-Alessón, 1st Marquess of Ceballos-Carvajal (with succession), and secondly don Francisco de Urruela y Lara.

Honors 

 Count of Consuegra
 Mayordomo Mayor of the Queen 
 Caballerizo Mayor of the Queen 
 Tutor and Chief of Staff of the infanta doña Cristina 
 Chief of Staff of the infanta doña María Teresa
 Knight of the Sovereign Order of Malta
 Knight Grand Cross of the Order of Isabel la Católica (1893).
 Knight Grand Cross of the Order of Carlos III.
 Knight of the Collar of the Order of Carlos III (elevated in 1908).
 Knight Grand Cross of the Order of the Légion d'Honneur (France).
 Knight Grand Cross of the Imperial Order of the Iron Crown (Austria-Hungary).
 Knight Grand Cross of the Order of Christ (Portugal).
 Knight Grand Cross of the Order of Leopold (Belgium).

|-

|-

Marquesses of Spain
Counts of Spain
Mayors of Madrid
Foreign ministers of Spain
1837 births
1914 deaths
Conservative Party (Spain) politicians
Grandees of Spain
Knights Grand Cross of the Order of Isabella the Catholic
Grand Crosses of the Order of Christ (Portugal)
Honorary Knights Grand Cross of the Royal Victorian Order